Lebourg is a surname. Notable people with the surname include:

Albert Lebourg (1849–1928), French Impressionist and Post-Impressionist landscape painter of the Rouen School 
Charles-Auguste Lebourg (1829–1906), French sculptor
Nicolas Lebourg (born 1974), French historian
Pierrick Lebourg (born 1989), French professional footballer